Phenomy is a metal band from Lebanon formed by Loïc El Haddad (guitarist) and Rudy Bejjani (drummer). They are   one of the fastest growing bands in Lebanon and the Middle East.

The current lineup includes Rudy Bejjani, Loïc El Haddad, Sam Felfly (vocals/guitars) and Peter Aoun (bass guitar). Phenomy started out releasing music influenced by thrash metal and groove metal, such as Metallica and Pantera. 

The band has participated in their local metal scene. They started as a support act, and after gaining stage experience and forming a fanbase, they started headlining local shows. This contributed to the rebirth of the metal scene in Lebanon.

History 
Phenomy consisted of founders Loïc El Haddad, Rudy Bejjani, Adel Hassan (vocals), Dany Arfan (guitar) and Raymond Ghorayeb (bass). 

The quintet started to get booked in local shows just 3 months after their formation in the Persian Rock And Metal Festival in Çanakkale, Turkey. Phenomy played their first show in December 2014, at Christmas Mission, a charity event that hosted more than 20 bands. 

The lineup changed when the band entered the studio to record their first album Once And For All. Sam Felfly joined the band to become the new vocalist, and Kevin Ghanem took over the bass guitar.

After releasing Once And For All, Phenomy went on to their first European tour and toured Eastern European countries including Hungary, Romania, Serbia, Croatia and Bulgaria. They became one of the few Middle Eastern bands to tour in Europe. 

The band worked on a set of songs with Tribal and Ethnic influences mixed with the Thrash/Groove metal sounds on their second album Threaten World Order. The album was released in February 2018. The album included fan-favorites Sacrifice and Dance of the Wounded Souls, that became anticipated tracks to be played live by the band.

Phenomy entered the Middle Eastern Wacken Battle of the Bands, a competition that allowed them to play at one of the biggest metal festivals, Wacken Open Air. The band also performed in the Metalhead Meeting Festival a month before W.O.A, sharing the stage with Children of Bodom, Soulfly, Epica, Sonata Arctica, Kataklysm, Carach Angren and many more.

Lebanese thrash / groove metal titans Phenomy have unleashed their new album Syndicate Of Pain, on March 3, 2022.

Syndicate Of Pain is a concept album about an asylum ran by Dr Anton Shuman, a mad scientist that is manipulating criminals and patients labelled insane in his facility. The album later reveals that these patients are not being cured, but are part of a bigger and darker project, that even Dr Schuman himself is being deceived by its stand out.

Band members

Current members 
 Sam Felfly – lead vocals (2016–present); rhythm guitar (2021–present)
 Loïc El Haddad – lead guitar, backing vocals (2014–present)
 Peter Aoun – bass, backing vocals (2018–present)
 Rudy Bejjani – drums, percussion (2014–present)

Former members 
 Adel Hassan – lead vocals (2014–2015)
 Raymond Ghorayeb – bass (2014–2016)
 Kevin Ghanem – bass (2016–2017)
 Dany Arfan – rhythm guitar (2014–2021)

Discography

Studio albums 

 Once and for All (2016)
 Threaten World Order (2018)
 Syndicate Of Pain (2022)

Singles 
 Day of Reckoning (2017)
 The Memory Remains – Metallica cover (2019)
 Hurt – Nine Inch Nails cover (2020)
 The Mute, the Deaf, the Blind (2020)
 Bone Orchid (2021)
 Ominous (2021)
 Lead Me To My Throne (2022)
 Beyond The Wall Of Sleep (2022)
 When The Darkness Comes (2022)
 Downward Spiral (2023)

Endorsements

Solar Guitars 

Loïc El Haddad (guitarist) joined the Solar Guitars artist roster in March 2020, Sam Felfly (Vocalist/Guitarist) followed in May 2021.

Bosphorus Cymbals 

Rudy Bejjani (drummer) has been endorsed by Bosphorus Cymbals since October 2018.

References 

2014 establishments in Lebanon
Groove metal musical groups
Lebanese heavy metal musical groups
Musical groups established in 2014
Musical quintets
Thrash metal musical groups